Elizabeth Patricia Tennet (born 1953) is a former New Zealand politician.

Biography

Early life
Tennet was born in 1953 in Feilding. She was educated locally before studying at Massey and Victoria University. Before entering politics, she worked as an official at the Department of Labour and as a trade union organiser as general secretary of the Central Clerical Workers Union.

Prior to entering Parliament, Tennet was involved in the Labour Party at an organisational level. She was a member of Labour's Women's Council, the Regional Council for the Wellington region and a member of Labour's National Executive.

Political career

She was an MP from 1987 to 1996, representing the Labour Party. She was first elected to Parliament in the 1987 elections as MP for the Wellington electorate of Island Bay, replacing the retiring Frank O'Flynn. She gave birth to her son while an MP and travelled to Parliament with her 24-day-old child to attend a special caucus meeting in 1988 to support Prime Minister David Lange in a leadership challenge by sacked finance minister Roger Douglas.

In 1990 she became Labour's junior whip as well as becoming party spokesperson on employment and associate spokesperson on women's affairs.

In 1993, Tennet was awarded the New Zealand Suffrage Centennial Medal.

In the 1995 local elections she was chosen as the Labour Party's candidate for the Wellington mayoralty to replace the retiring Fran Wilde. Tennet came second in the election behind Mark Blumsky.

Later activities
In 2009, Tennet was appointed chief executive of industry development organisation Textiles New Zealand. In 2011 she became the chief executive of Community Law Centres o Aotearoa

Notes

References

External links
Liz Tennet in 1987 (photo)

Living people
New Zealand Labour Party MPs
1953 births
Women members of the New Zealand House of Representatives
New Zealand MPs for Wellington electorates
Members of the New Zealand House of Representatives
Recipients of the New Zealand Suffrage Centennial Medal 1993
New Zealand women chief executives